Yealand Redmayne is a village and civil parish in the English county  of Lancashire.

Community
The civil parish also includes the hamlet of Yealand Storrs. The village borders Yealand Conyers and the villages share their facilities.  The shared history of the Yealands goes back to at least the Norman invasion and they are recorded in the Doomsday Book as Jalant (this is presumed to include the area that became Silverdale). The local district also has a strong Viking history as seen in many of the names of nearby geographical features and place names as well as the recent discovery of the Silverdale Hoard in the village. Today, Yealand Redmayne is still the biggest village by area but has a smaller population than Silverdale.

The village contains a busy transport corridor as the A6 and M6 roads as well as the West Coast Main Line and the Lancaster Canal all pass through the parish. There is a miniature railway track near the A6 at Cinderbarrow.

Geography
The village is situated 11 miles north of Lancaster on the county boundary with Cumbria. Carnforth is the nearest town in Lancashire and Milnthorpe in Cumbria.

To the north is Beetham, to the east is Burton and north east Holme while its western boundary is with Silverdale, with Arnside, and the River Kent to the north west. To the south is Yealand Conyers and beyond that is Warton.

It is in the Arnside and Silverdale Area of Outstanding Natural Beauty and contains Gait Barrows National Nature Reserve and Storrs Moss (which comprises part of the Leighton Moss RSPB reserve).

Gallery

See also

Listed buildings in Yealand Redmayne

References

External links 

 
Yealand Redmayne Parish Council

Villages in Lancashire
Civil parishes in Lancashire
Geography of the City of Lancaster